Hot is the debut album by the English singer Mel B, released on 9 October 2000 by Virgin. It was not as successful as her albums with the Spice Girls or that of other members solo albums released around this time. It peaked at number twenty-eight in the United Kingdom and sold over 60,000 copies, receiving a silver certification. The album had three singles: "Tell Me", "Feels So Good" and "Lullaby" – the first two singles reached the top 5 in the United Kingdom. "I Want You Back" and "Word Up", Previously released for soundtracks two years earlier, was included in different versions. The album received negative reviews from critics.

Background
The album was released on 9 October 2000, less than a month before the release of Forever, the third studio album by the Spice Girls; this is cited as the main reason that Hot was not successful: fans were more interested in the Spice Girls comeback album rather than Melanie B's debut album. Despite being released only two weeks after the top 5 hit "Tell Me" and including single "I Want You Back", Hot entered the UK Albums Chart at No. 28 before quickly dropping from the chart completely. Hot was digitally released in the United States via the iTunes Store on 30 October 2007.

Four months after the album's release, the single "Feels So Good" was released, becoming a top 5 hit. This single helped the album re-enter the UK Albums Chart. The last single, "Lullaby" was released in June 2001, but was unable to make a great impact on album sales, therefore Hot re-entered the Top 200 for only one week. Altogether the album went on to sell over 53,000 copies. The track "Hotter" was set to be the album's fifth single, however, this was decided against because of the low charting of "Lullaby".

Singles
It debuted and peaked at #4, selling 107,317 copies. Feels So Good released as the album's second single on 19 February 2001. In the United Kingdom, it peaked and debuted at number five, becoming the 85th-best-selling single of 2001. Released on 4 June 2001 as final single, Lullaby peaked at number 13 on the UK Singles Chart.

Other songs
"I Want You Back" released in 1998 from the soundtrack to the 1998 film Why Do Fools Fall in Love and, after, included on Hot. The song peaked at number-one on the UK Singles Chart and consequently Missy Elliott became the first female rapper to reach number one in the UK.

"Word Up" was released from the soundtrack of the film Austin Powers: The Spy Who Shagged Me and was included on the Japanese version.

Track listing
Credits adapted from the liner notes of Hot.

Charts

Certifications

References

2000 debut albums
Albums produced by Jimmy Jam and Terry Lewis
Albums produced by Missy Elliott
Albums produced by Teddy Riley
Mel B albums
Albums produced by Timbaland